Bonku Babu (2014) is Bengali comedy movie directed by Anindya Bikas Datta, starring Saswata Chatterjee as Bonku Babu, a 70-year-old man. The film also stars Arjun Chakraborty and Arunima Ghosh.

References

Bengali-language Indian films
2010s Bengali-language films